Grant DeVolson Wood (February 13, 1891 February 12, 1942) was an American painter and representative of Regionalism, best known for his paintings depicting the rural American Midwest. He is particularly well known for American Gothic (1930), which has become an iconic example of early 20th-century American art.

Early life 

Wood was born in rural Iowa, 4 mi (6.43 km) east of Anamosa, on February 13, 1891, the son of Hattie DeEtte Weaver Wood and Francis Maryville Wood. His mother moved the family to Cedar Rapids after his father died in 1901. Soon thereafter, Wood began as an apprentice in a local metal shop. After graduating from Washington High School, Wood enrolled in The Handicraft Guild, an art school run entirely by women in Minneapolis in 1910.

In 1913, he enrolled at the School of the Art Institute of Chicago and performed some work as a silversmith.

Career

Close to the end of World War I, Wood joined the US military, working as an artist designing camouflage scenes as well as other art.

From 1919 to 1925, Wood taught art to junior high school students in the Cedar Rapids public school system. This employment provided financial stability and its seasonal nature allowed him summer trips to Europe to study art. In addition, he took a leave of absence for the 1923–1924 school year so he could spend an entire year studying in Europe.

From 1922 to 1935, Wood lived with his mother in the loft of a carriage house in Cedar Rapids, which he turned into his personal studio at "5 Turner Alley" (the studio had no address until Wood made one up).

From 1922 to 1928, Wood made four trips to Europe, where he studied many styles of painting, especially Impressionism and post-Impressionism. However, it was the work of the 15th-century Flemish artist Jan van Eyck that influenced him to take on the clarity of this technique and to incorporate it in his new works. In addition, his 1928 trip to Munich was to oversee the making of the stained glass windows he had designed for a Veterans Memorial Building in Cedar Rapids.

In 1932, Wood helped found the Stone City Art Colony near his hometown to help artists get through the Great Depression. He became a great proponent of regionalism in the arts, lecturing throughout the country on the topic. As his classically American image was solidified, his bohemian days in Paris were expunged from his public persona.

From 1934 to 1941 Wood taught painting at the University of Iowa's School of Art. During that time, he supervised mural painting projects, mentored students, produced a variety of his own works, and became a key part of the university's cultural community.

Personal life
From 1935 to 1938, Wood was married to Sara Sherman Maxon. Friends considered the marriage a mistake for Wood.

It is thought that Wood was a closeted homosexual, and that there was an attempt on the part of a senior colleague, Lester Longman, to get him fired both on moral grounds and for his advocacy of regionalism. Critic Janet Maslin states that his friends knew him to be "homosexual and a bit facetious in his masquerade as an overall-clad farm boy."  University administration dismissed the allegations and Wood would have returned as professor if not for his growing health problems.

Wood was an avid Freemason and Member of Mount Hermon Lodge #263 in Cedar Rapids, Iowa. After receiving his 3rd Degree of Master Mason he painted The First Three Degrees of Freemasonry in 1921. Freemasonry influenced multiple pieces of work by Grant Wood in his life, and furthered his moral and ethical beliefs.

Death and legacy
On the eve of his 51st birthday, Wood died at Iowa City university hospital of pancreatic cancer. He is buried at Riverside Cemetery, Anamosa, Iowa.

When Wood died, his estate went to his sister, Nan Wood Graham, the woman portrayed in American Gothic. When she died in 1990, her estate, along with Wood's personal effects and various works of art, became the property of the Figge Art Museum in Davenport, Iowa.

The World War II Liberty Ship  was named in his honor.

In 2009, Grant was awarded the Iowa Prize, the state's highest citizen honor.

Grant Wood Area Education Agency, one of Iowa's nine regional Area Education Agencies established in 1974, which is serving Eastern Iowa, was named after Grant Wood.

Work
Wood was an active painter from an extremely young age until his death, and although he is best known for his paintings, he worked in a large number of media, including lithography, ink, charcoal, ceramics, metal, wood and found objects.

Throughout his life, he hired out his talents to many Iowa-based businesses as a steady source of income. This included painting advertisements, sketching rooms of a mortuary house for promotional flyers and, in one case, designing the corn-themed décor (including chandelier) for the dining room of a hotel.

Regionalism
Wood is associated with the American movement of Regionalism, which was primarily situated in the Midwest, and advanced figurative painting of rural American themes in an aggressive rejection of European abstraction.

Wood was one of three artists most associated with the movement. The others, John Steuart Curry and Thomas Hart Benton, returned to the Midwest in the 1930s due to Wood's encouragement and assistance with locating teaching positions for them at colleges in Wisconsin and Missouri, respectively. Along with Benton, Curry, and other Regionalist artists, Wood's work was marketed through Associated American Artists in New York for many years. Wood is considered the patron artist of Cedar Rapids, and his childhood country school is depicted on the 2004 Iowa State Quarter.

American Gothic

Wood's best known work is his 1930 painting American Gothic, which is also one of the most famous paintings in American art, and one of the few images to reach the status of widely recognized cultural icon, comparable to Leonardo da Vinci's Mona Lisa and Edvard Munch's The Scream.

American Gothic was first exhibited in 1930 at the Art Institute of Chicago, where it is still located. It was given a $300 prize and made news stories country-wide, bringing Wood immediate recognition. Since then, it has been borrowed and satirized endlessly for advertisements and cartoons.

Art critics who had favorable opinions about the painting, such as Gertrude Stein and Christopher Morley, assumed the painting was meant to be a satire of repression and narrow-mindedness of rural small-town life. It was seen as part of the trend toward increasingly critical depictions of rural America, along the lines of such novels as Sherwood Anderson's 1919 Winesburg, Ohio, Sinclair Lewis's 1920 Main Street, and Carl Van Vechten's The Tattooed Countess. Wood rejected this reading of it. With the onset of the Great Depression, it came to be seen as a depiction of steadfast American pioneer spirit. Another reading is that it is an ambiguous fusion of reverence and parody.

Wood's inspiration came from Eldon, southern Iowa, where a cottage designed in the Gothic Revival style with an upper window in the shape of a medieval pointed arch provided the background and also the painting's title. Wood decided to paint the house along with "the kind of people I fancied should live in that house." The painting shows a farmer standing beside his spinster daughter, figures modeled by the artist's sister, Nan (1900–1990), and his dentist. Wood's sister insisted that the painting depicts the farmer's daughter and not wife, disliking suggestions it was the farmer's wife, since that would mean that she looks older than Wood's sister preferred to think of herself. The dentist, Dr. Byron McKeeby (1867–1950), was from Cedar Rapids. The woman is dressed in a dark print apron mimicking 19th-century Americana with a cameo brooch.  The couple are in the traditional roles of men and women, the man's pitchfork symbolizing hard labor.

The compositional severity and detailed technique derive from Northern Renaissance paintings, which Grant had looked at during three visits to Europe; after this he became increasingly aware of the Midwest's own legacy, which also informs the work. It is a key image of Regionalism.

Wood was hired in 1940, along with eight other prominent American artists, to document and interpret dramatic scenes and characters during the production of the film The Long Voyage Home, a cinematic adaptation of Eugene O'Neill's plays.

Gallery

List of works

Paintings
Spotted Man (1924)
The Little Chapel Chancelade (1926)
Woman with Plants (1929)
American Gothic (1930)
Arnold Comes of Age (1930)
Stone City, Iowa (1930)
Appraisal (1931)
Young Corn (1931)
Fall Plowing (1931)
The Birthplace of Herbert Hoover, West Branch, Iowa (1931)
The Midnight Ride of Paul Revere (1931)
Plaid Sweater (1931)
Self-Portrait (1932)
Arbor Day (1932)
Boy Milking Cow (1932)
Daughters of Revolution (1932)
Portrait of Nan (1933)
Near Sundown (1933)
Dinner for Threshers (1934)
Return from Bohemia (1935)
Death on Ridge Road (1935)
Spring Turning (1936)
Seedtime and Harvest (1937)
Sultry Night (1937)
Haying (1939)
New Road (1939)
Parson Weems' Fable (1939)
January (1940)
Iowa Cornfield (1941)
Spring in the Country (1941)

Writing
 Wood, Grant. "Art in the Daily Life of the Child." Rural America, March 1940, 7–9.
 Revolt against the City. Iowa City: Clio Press, 1935.

References

Sources
 Corn, Wanda M. Grant Wood: The Regionalist Vision. New Haven: Minneapolis Institute of Arts and Yale University Press, 1983.
 Crowe, David. "Illustration as Interpretation: Grant Wood's 'New Deal' Reading of Sinclair Lewis's Main Street." In Sinclair Lewis at 100: Papers Presented at a Centennial Conference, edited by Michael Connaughton, 95–111. St. Cloud, MN: St. Cloud State University, 1985.
 Czestochowski, Joseph S. John Steuart Curry and Grant Wood: A Portrait of Rural America. Columbia: University of Missouri Press and Cedar Rapids Art Association, 1981.
 DeLong, Lea Rosson. Grant Wood's Main Street: Art, Literature and the American Midwest. Ames: Exhibition catalog from the Brunnier Art Museum at Iowa State University, 2004.
 When Tillage Begins, Other Arts Follow: Grant Wood and Christian Petersen Murals. Ames: Exhibition catalog from the Brunnier Art Museum at Iowa State University, 2006.
 Dennis, James M. Grant Wood: A Study in American Art and Culture. New York: Viking Press, 1975.
 Renegade Regionalists: The Modern Independence of Grant Wood, Thomas Hart Benton, and John Steuart Curry. Madison: University of Wisconsin Press, 1998.
 Evans, R. Tripp. Grant Wood [A Life]. New York: Alfred A. Knopf, 2010 .
 Graham, Nan Wood, John Zug, and Julie Jensen McDonald. My Brother, Grant Wood. Iowa City: State Historical Society of Iowa, 1993.
 Green, Edwin B. A Grant Wood Sampler, January Issue of the Palimpsest. Iowa City: State Historical Society of Iowa, 1972.
 Haven, Janet. "Going Back to Iowa: The World of Grant Wood", MA project in conjunction with the Museum for American Studies of the American Studies Program at the University of Virginia, 1998; includes list of paintings and gallery.
 Hoving, Thomas. American Gothic: The Biography of Grant Wood's American Masterpiece. New York: Chamberlain Brothers, 2005.
 Milosch, Jane C., ed. Grant Wood’s Studio: Birthplace of American Gothic. Cedar Rapids and New York: Cedar Rapids Museum of Art and Prestel, 2005.
 Seery, John E. "Grant Wood's Political Gothic." Theory & Event 2, no. 1 (1998).
 Taylor, Sue. "Grant Wood's Family Album." American Art 19, no. 2 (2005): 48–67.

External links

 Work by Grant Wood.
 Grant Wood scrapbooks at the Iowa Digital Library
 Grant Wood's Studio
 Grant Wood Gallery at MuseumSyndicate 
 The Long Voyage Home Artist Portraits and Paintings at The Ned Scott Archive
 "Grant Woods Murals in the Parks Library at Iowa State University"
 

 
1891 births
1942 deaths
School of the Art Institute of Chicago alumni
Académie Julian alumni
20th-century American painters
20th-century male artists
American male painters
University of Iowa faculty
Painters from Iowa
Artists from Cedar Rapids, Iowa
People from Anamosa, Iowa
Artists from Park Ridge, Illinois
American portrait painters
20th-century American printmakers
Deaths from cancer in Iowa
Deaths from pancreatic cancer
Burials in Iowa
American Freemasons
Public Works of Art Project artists